S85 is a line on the Berlin S-Bahn. It operates from Grünau to Berlin-Pankow over:
the Berlin–Görlitz railway, opened on 13 September 1866 and electrified on 4 January 1929,
the Ringbahn, opened on 17 July 1871 and electrified in 1926 and
the Prussian Northern Railway, opened on 10 July 1877 and electrified in 1925.

The S85 presently only runs Monday to Friday.

References 

Berlin S-Bahn lines

fi:S85 (Berliinin S-Bahn)